is a Japanese football player currently playing for Matsumoto Yamaga F.C. He previously played for J. League division 2 side Sagan Tosu as DF and MF.

After graduating from high school, he entered Saga University and joined its soccer club. As a senior in 2004, he was made the team's captain.  After graduating Saga University, he chose to continue training to become a professional rather than seek employment. He received an amateur contract in 2006. and his first professional contract in 2007.

Club career statistics
Updated to 23 February 2016.

References

External links

1982 births
Living people
Saga University alumni
Association football people from Kumamoto Prefecture
Japanese footballers
J1 League players
J2 League players
Japan Football League players
Sagan Tosu players
Matsumoto Yamaga FC players
Association football defenders